The Brixton Black Women's Group (BWG) was an organisation for black women in Brixton. One of the first black women's groups in the UK, the BWG existed from 1973 to 1985. A socialist feminist group, it aimed to raise consciousness and organise around issues specifically affecting black women.

Several of the group's founding members, such as Beverley Bryan, Olive Morris and Liz Obi, had previously been active in the British Black Panthers. For its first two years the group lacked dedicated meeting space, and met in members' homes. Later, together with the Mary Seacole Craft Group, the BWG established the Mary Seacole House, renamed the Black Women's Centre in 1979. The BWG also published a newsletter, Speak Out.

References

1973 establishments in England
Organizations established in 1973
Women's organisations based in England
Black feminist organizations
Brixton
Socialist feminist organizations
Feminist organisations in England
Defunct organisations based in London
Black British history
Women in London